Gozd is a dispersed settlement on the edge of a karst plateau east of Ajdovščina in the Littoral region of Slovenia. Together with the ridge-top villages of  Predmeja, Kovk, and Otlica, it is part of an area locally known as Gora (literally, 'the mountain').

References

External links 

Gozd at Geopedia

Populated places in the Municipality of Ajdovščina